Michaela Jean Burton (born July 8, 1994) is an American actress, cosplayer and host. She is known for her contributions in the gaming space, having hosted for Achievement Hunter, The Know, the Overwatch League and voicing a character in 100ft Robot Golf.

Burton has been referred to as a "nerd renaissance woman" by The New York Times and has been noted as one of only a few professional black cosplayers by Essence.

Career

Acting 
In 2015, Burton portrayed the role of Jules in the film Lazer Team (2015). She also briefly appeared in The Eleven Little Roosters (2017).

She voiced Vahni in 100ft Robot Golf (2016). Burton is known for her roles in actual play RPG web shows such as Wizards of the Coast's Destiny & Doom (2017) and Nights of Eveningstar (2020). Burton also guest starred in Critical Role's second campaign and in L.A. by Night.

Burton will play 
ensign Alandra La Forge in the third season of Star Trek: Picard.

Cosplay 
Burton began cosplaying in high school after attending a convention with a friend. She was commissioned by Riot Games to create League of Legends cosplay in 2019. She has also received praise for cosplays of characters from The Legend of Zelda.<ref>{{Cite web|date=February 22, 2021|title=Nintendo "forget" 'Zeldas 35th anniversary, so fans honour it online instead|url=https://www.nme.com/en_au/news/gaming-news/nintendo-legend-of-zelda-35th-anniversary-fans-2886489|access-date=September 1, 2021|website=NME|language=en-AU}}</ref>

 Hosting 
Burton, who had been a fan of the company since she was a child, joined Rooster Teeth in 2016 after meeting the founders and other employees. She began as a host in the gaming division Achievement Hunter, but later moved to the entertainment news division The Know. She left Rooster Teeth in 2018, stating in 2020 that this was due to racial issues at the company.

In 2019, Burton joined the Overwatch League as a “League Insider”, conducting interviews with the players. She left in 2020.

Burton has hosted multiple Dungeons & Dragons events for Wizards of the Coast such as D&D Live 2019: The Descent and D&D Live 2021. Burton began cohosting the web series Critter Hug'' in 2020 for Critical Role Productions.

She was a speaker at Ubisoft’s monthly Black Game Pros event in 2020. She hosted a cosplay competition at Glitchcon 2020. Burton was a cohost for a Star Trek anniversary stream in 2020  and multiple Star Trek streams on Paramount+ in 2021 

Burton hosted The PC Gaming Show during E3 2021 and during Summer Game Fest 2022.

Personal life 
Burton is the daughter of makeup artist Stephanie Cozart-Burton and actor LeVar Burton.

Burton graduated from the University of Michigan in 2016 with a BFA in acting.

She is bisexual.

Filmography

Live-action filmography

Voice-over filmography

References

External links 
 
 

1994 births
Living people
21st-century American actresses
Actresses from Los Angeles
African-American actresses
American film actresses
American television actresses
American video game actresses
American voice actresses
Bisexual actresses
Cosplayers
Rooster Teeth people
Video game commentators
Women in esports
University of Michigan alumni
LGBT people from California
LGBT African Americans
21st-century American LGBT people
American media personalities